Randall Goff (born 15 March 1953) is a former water polo player from Australia, who competed for his native country at two consecutive Summer Olympics, starting in 1976. He finished in 11th and 7th position with the Australian National Men's Team.

References

External links
 Australian Olympic Committee

1953 births
Australian male water polo players
Olympic water polo players of Australia
Water polo players at the 1976 Summer Olympics
Water polo players at the 1980 Summer Olympics
Living people